State Highway 273 (SH 273) is a state highway that runs from Pampa in northern Texas east and south to SH 203 near Hedley.

History
The route was originally designated on July 30, 1938 from Pampa to McLean. On November 4, 1971, an extension along Ranch to Market Road 2695 to US 287 along was signed, but not designated. On August 29, 1990 the current route was completed by redesignating Ranch to Market Road 2695 from McLean to SH 203 as part of SH 273.

Route description
Beginning at a junction with US 60 at Pampa in Gray County, SH 273 runs south to a junction with Loop 171. In Pampa the highway is known as Cuyler Street and Barnes Street. After a brief co-routing with Loop 171, the highway runs southeast to Lefors and then south to a junction with Interstate 40 at McLean, where the route is known as Sitter Street. SH 273 then runs almost directly south to its final junction with SH 203 near Hedley in Donley County. Most of the terrain covered by the highway is lightly populated ranch and oil country.

Junction list

References

External links
Texas official travel map at the Texas Department of Transportation (Adobe Acrobat format, magnification required for legibility)
Satellite image of junction of SH 273 with I-40 at Google Maps

273
Transportation in Donley County, Texas
Transportation in Gray County, Texas